Brazil is a city in Clay County, Indiana, United States. The population was 7,912 at the 2010 census. The city is the county seat of Clay County. It is part of the Terre Haute Metropolitan Statistical Area. The current chief executive of Brazil is Mayor Brian Wyndham (Democrat).

History

In the 1840s, the owners of the farm which would later originate the city of Brazil decided to name their farm after the country of Brazil, because that country was often the subject of news at the time.
The city was founded in 1866 under the name of that farm.
As of now, Brazil is a part of the Terre Haute Metropolitan Statistical Area. Clay county, which was formed in 1825, originally had Bowling Green as its county seat; the county seat was relocated to Brazil in 1876, following the city's incredible development.

The Chafariz dos Contos (from "contos de réis", a former Brazilian currency) was given by the country of Brazil as a gift to the city, as a symbol of friendship, and was assembled in Forest Park in 1956. It is a replica of the original fountain located in Ouro Preto, State of Minas Gerais,  Brazil, built in 1745.

In 2010, Brazil gained national attention for having accepted money from Kentucky Fried Chicken for the rights to display the KFC and Fiery Grilled Wings logos on city fire hydrants.

The Brazil Downtown Historic District, Clay County Courthouse, Clay County Hospital, Meridian-Forest Historic District, and US Post Office-Brazil are listed on the National Register of Historic Places.

Geography

Brazil is located at  (39.525000, -87.127500).

Brazil experiences warm, even hot and humid summers and cold winters as part of the humid continental climate.

Demographics

2010 census

As of the 2010 census, there were 7,912 people, 3,154 households, and 2,018 families living in the city. The racial makeup of the city was 97.1% White, 0.6% African American, 0.1% Native American, 0.5% Asian, 0.6% from other races, and 1.0% from two or more races. Hispanic or Latino of any race were 1.6% of the population.

There were 3,154 households, of which 35.1% had children under the age of 18 living with them, 41.7% were married couples living together, 16.7% had a female householder with no husband present, 5.5% had a male householder with no wife present, and 36.0% were non-families. 30.1% of all households were made up of individuals, and 12.5% had someone living alone who was 65 years of age or older. The average household size was 2.46 and the average family size was 3.04.

The median age in the city was 36.2 years. 26% of residents were under the age of 18; 9.4% were between the ages of 18 and 24; 26.2% were from 25 to 44; 23.9% were from 45 to 64; and 14.4% were 65 years of age or older. The gender makeup of the city was 48.0% male and 52.0% female.

2000 census

As of the 2000 census, there were 8,188 people, 3,383 households, and 2,151 families living in the city. The racial makeup of the city was 97.80% White, 0.64% African American, 0.37% Native American, 0.17% Asian, 0.02% Pacific Islander, 0.28% from other races, and 0.72% from two or more races. Hispanic or Latino of any race were 0.61% of the population.

There were 3,383 households, out of which 30.2% had children under the age of 18 living with them, 46.7% were married couples living together, 13.1% had a female householder with no husband present, and 36.4% were non-families. 32.2% of all households were made up of individuals, and 17.3% had someone living alone who was 65 years of age or older. The average household size was 2.38 and the average family size was 3.01.

In the city, the population was spread out, with 25.8% under the age of 18, 9.5% from 18 to 24, 26.8% from 25 to 44, 20.6% from 45 to 64, and 17.3% who were 65 years of age or older. The median age was 36 years. For every 100 females, there were 89.7 males. For every 100 females age 18 and over, there were 86.1 males.

The median income for a household in the city was $30,902, and the median income for a family was $37,569. Males had a median income of $29,693 versus $20,215 for females. The per capita income for the city was $15,123. About 10.7% of families and 13.2% of the population were below the poverty line, including 18.5% of those under age 18 and 12.8% of those age 65 or over.

Poverty
A 2018 study by 24/7 Wall Street found that Brazil is the poorest city in Indiana. At the time of the study 31.6% of Brazil's population lived below the poverty line.

Government

The government consists of a mayor and a city council. The mayor is elected in citywide vote. The city council consists of five members. Four are elected from individual districts. One is elected at-large.

Education

The Brazil, Staunton, and Van Buren high schools were consolidated into Northview High School, which graduated its first class in 1985. Brazil High School replaced the original high school, built circa 1906. Built in 1916, it was located on the southeast corner of SR59 and Kruzan, now occupied by the YMCA. Like many other Indiana schools, it was designed by the Terre Haute architectural firm of Johnson, Miller, and Miller.

The city has a free lending library, the Brazil Public Library.

Transportation

Traffic/street issues

The main street of Brazil is U.S. Route 40, the historic National Road, which is referred to as National Avenue within Brazil. Due to frequent accidents on Interstate 70, five miles (8 km) to the south of the town and often under construction, police often re-route traffic through Brazil, which creates traffic problems on U.S. 40 and the north-south State Road 59 (Forest Avenue, which intersects U.S. 40).

Many of Brazil's streets are in disrepair and very bumpy.  The original brick roadbed is visible in many places through the asphalt. Also evident in several sections are stretches of the original brick streets in excellent condition; however, many intersections have no traffic control devices (stop/yield signs). Many of the roads in the city were replaced with new asphalt. The work began in 2015 and, over several years, the majority of the streets will be replaced.

The annual Parke County Covered Bridge Festival often causes traffic problems on Indiana 59.

Brazil's sewer/drainage system dates from the early 20th century. Even though large sections of the sewer system were replaced in the late 20th century, a moderate rainstorm will cause the storm drain system to back up and flood town streets.

Airport

Rail

The Terre Haute, Brazil and Eastern Railroad was a short-line railroad that once ran a tourist excursion called the Beaver Creek Express between Brazil and Limedale. The line was dismantled after TBER entered bankruptcy and ceased operation on December 31, 1993.

Notable people

 Gerald Eades Bentley, scholar of Elizabethan theater
Gene Cramer, NBL player
 George N. Craig, governor of Indiana, Past National Commander of American Legion  
 Johnnie Davis, musician, band leader
 Joe Dean, American basketball player, announcer and college athletic director
 John Dugan, actor
 Ivan Fuqua, winner of gold medal in 4×400m relay at the 1932 Summer Olympics
 David Goggins, Navy SEAL, athlete
 Charles B. Hall, iconic combat fighter pilot and U.S. Army Air Corps Officer with the Tuskegee Airmen
 Jimmy Hoffa, Labor Union leader
 Judy Ledgerwood, Abstract painter and educator
 Gayle Porter Hoskins, illustrator
 Stuart Randall, actor who played Sheriff Mort Corey on Laramie
 Orville Redenbacher, popcorn tycoon
 Ralph Francis Stearley, 2-star Air Force general in Gen. Eisenhower's Cabinet
 Henry Lee Summer, 1980s pop singer

Climate

Climate is characterized by relatively high temperatures and evenly distributed precipitation throughout the year.  The Köppen Climate Classification subtype for this climate is "Cfa" (humid subtropical climate).

See also 
 Parke County Covered Bridge Festival (15 miles north of Brazil)

References

External links

 

Cities in Clay County, Indiana
Cities in Indiana
County seats in Indiana
National Road
Terre Haute metropolitan area
1866 establishments in Indiana
Populated places established in 1866